Eduardo Silva (born 7 October 1928) is a Chilean alpine skier. He competed in three events at the 1952 Winter Olympics.

References

1928 births
Living people
Chilean male alpine skiers
Olympic alpine skiers of Chile
Alpine skiers at the 1952 Winter Olympics
Place of birth missing (living people)